Turridrupa armillata is a species of sea snail, a marine gastropod mollusk in the family Turridae, the turrids.

Description
The length of the shell attains 29.7 mm.

Distribution
This marine species occurs off the Philippines and Papua New Guinea.

References

External links
 Reeve LA. 1843–46. Monograph of the genus Pleurotoma. Conchologia Iconica, or Illustra-tions of the shells of molluscous animals. London: Reeve Brothers. Vol. 1: pls 1–18(1843), pl. 19 (1844), pls 20–33 (1845); pls 34– 40, index and errata (1846)
  Baoquan Li 李宝泉 & R.N. Kilburn, Report on Crassispirinae Morrison, 1966 (Mollusca: Neogastropoda: Turridae) from the China Seas; Journal of Natural History 44(11):699–740 · March 2010; DOI: 10.1080/00222930903470086

armillata
Gastropods described in 1845